The 2010 AFC Cup was the seventh edition of the AFC Cup, playing between clubs from nations who are members of the Asian Football Confederation.

With the Asian Football Confederation currently reviewing the format of the AFC Champions League between 2009 and 2010 season, significant changes were made in the way the competition is run, the teams that will qualify for the AFC Cup is also expected to be from different countries compared to the previous editions.

Qualification

The preliminary qualification scheme for the AFC 2010 was released in 2008. A total of 33 clubs were due to participate in the 2010 AFC Cup (eventually reduced to 31).

Qualifying play-off (2 teams)
The teams were from the following associations:
 Qatar
 Uzbekistan
However, the qualifying play-off was not needed and both teams advanced automatically in the group stage after FIFA's suspension of the Iraqi Football Association was not lifted by 6 January 2010.

Group stage (32 teams)
Qualifying play-off winner (eventually not played)
2 teams to qualify from each of the following associations:
 Hong Kong
 Iraq
 Jordan
 Kuwait
 Lebanon
 Maldives
 Oman
 Syria
 Yemen
Both teams from Iraq were disqualified after FIFA's suspension on the Iraq Football Association was not lifted on 6 January 2010.
1 team to qualify from each of the following associations:
 Bahrain
 India
 Indonesia
 Malaysia
 Singapore
 Thailand
 Vietnam
6 losers from 2010 AFC Champions League qualifying play-offs (including any of the 2009 AFC Cup finalists which fail to fulfil the criteria set by AFC to compete in the 2010 AFC Champions League, and thus directly enter the 2010 AFC Cup)

Notes
 Three teams from elite countries have been given a chance to take part in the 2010 AFC Cup competition, therefore a qualifying play-off match has been added to the calendar (eventually not played).
 For the second time in its history, teams from Kuwait will join the AFC Cup fray. Syrian clubs again reappear in the competition after winning the inaugural edition (Al Jaish) in 2004. 
 A Qatari team will participate in the tournament for the first time.

Qualifying teams

The following is the list of participants confirmed by the AFC.

1 Al-Kuwait failed to fulfil the criteria set by AFC to compete in the 2010 AFC Champions League, and so directly enter the 2010 AFC Cup.

2 Nasaf Qarshi were due to host Al-Rayyan in the qualifying play-off, with the winner advancing to the group stage (Group E). However, both teams advanced automatically to the group stage after the two teams from Iraq, Arbil (Group C) and Najaf (Group B), were disqualified after FIFA's suspension on the Iraq Football Association was not lifted on 6 January 2010. As a result, the tournament was reduced to 31 teams.

3 Negeri Sembilan FA (second representative of Malaysia) withdrew, and was replaced by Persiwa Wamena.

Schedule
The 2010 AFC Cup will have the same format as the 2009 AFC Cup.

Group stage

The draw for the group stage was held on 7 December 2009 in Kuala Lumpur, Malaysia. The ACL play-off losers were placed in their groups on 8 February 2010.

Each club plays double round-robin (home and away) against fellow three group members, a total of 6 matches each. Clubs receive 3 points for a win, 1 point for a tie, 0 points for a loss. The clubs are ranked according to points and tie breakers are in following order: 
Greater number of points obtained in the group matches between the teams concerned;
Goal difference resulting from the group matches between the teams concerned; (Away goals do not apply)
Greater number of goals scored in the group matches between the teams concerned; (Away goals do not apply)
Goal difference in all the group matches;
Greater number of goals scored in all the group matches;
Kicks from the penalty mark if only two teams are involved and they are both on the field of play;
Fewer score calculated according to the number of yellow and red cards received in the group matches; (1 point for each yellow card, 3 points for each red card as a consequence of two yellow cards, 3 points for each direct red card, 4 points for each yellow card followed by a direct red card)
Drawing of lots.

Winners and runners-up of each group will qualify for the next round.

Group A

Group B

Group C

Group D

Group E

Group F

Group G

Group H

Knockout stage

Round of 16
The matches were played on 11 and 12 May 2010.

|}

Quarter-finals 
The draw for the remaining rounds was held in Kuala Lumpur, Malaysia on 25 May 2010. Because of the country protection rule, if there are two clubs from the same country, they will not face each other in the quarter-finals. Therefore, the two clubs from Syria, Kuwait, and Thailand may not be drawn with each other in the quarter-finals.

The first legs were played on 14 and 15 September, and the second legs were played on 21 and 22 September 2010.

|}

Semi-finals
The first legs were played on 5 October, and the second legs were played on 19 October 2010.

|}

Final

The final was played on 6 November 2010. It was a one-leg match originally set to be played at the host stadium of one of the finalists, but was changed to a larger capacity stadium one week before the final.

Statistics

Top goalscorers

References

External links
AFC Cup Official Page 

 
2
2010